Maireana cheelii, common name -  chariot wheels, is a species of flowering plant in the family Amaranthaceae, native to Victoria, New South Wales,  and Queensland (where it is extinct). It is found on seasonally wet, heavy loams and clay soils.

It was first described in 1934 by Robert Henry Anderson as Kochia cheelii, but in 1975 Paul Wilson re-assigned it to the genus, Maireana.  

It is a "vulnerable" species under the EPBC Act. Threats to its current populations include: weed invasion, grazing by stock, roadworks, and recreational vehicle use

References

External links
Maireana cheelii images & occurrence data from GBIF.

cheelii
Endemic flora of Australia
Flora of New South Wales
Flora of Victoria (Australia)
Taxa named by Robert Henry Anderson
Plants described in 1934